El porvenir is a 2015 short documentary film directed by Alfredo Alcántara and Josh Chertoff. The premiere was aired at the 2015 South by Southwest (SXSW) Film Festival. El porvenir is an inside look at the world of Mexican cockfighting, where men and roosters meet at the intersection of life, death, and sport.

Plot 
This short documentary follows Abelardo Olguín Cuevas, a third-generation Mexican cockfighter struggling to hold on to his family's traditions in the face of a growing movement to ban the sport across the country. Cockfighting has been Abelardo's passion since he was five years old. Now, with children of his own, he hopes to pass on tradition, but he and his fellow cockfighters see the world changing before their eyes.

The film explores Abelardo's day-to-day life in Ixmiquilpan, Central Mexico, from his farm, where he trains his roosters, to the cockfighting tournaments. A unique glimpse into the vibrant and controversial culture of cockfighting.

About the film 
The director's goal in dealing with this controversial subject was to remain as objective as possible and not pass any judgment. The film does not aim at answering any moral or ethical questions but rather explore the world of the passionate Mexican cockfighter.

References

External links 
 
 Official website

2015 films
American short documentary films
2010s Spanish-language films
Cockfighting in film
2015 short documentary films
2010s American films